Marge Records or Futura Marge was a jazz record label created in France in 1973 by Gérard Terronès as a continuation of Futura Records. The label changed its name in 2018 to Futura Marge.

Discography

Blue Marge
Archie Shepp -  Attica Blues	(1979)
Roy Haynes - Live at the Riverbop	(1979)
Abbey Lincoln - Painted Lady	(1980)
François Cahen & Yochk'o Seffer - Ethnic Duo	(1980)
Sam Rivers - Crosscurrent	(1981)
Roger Raspail  - Fanny's Dream (1997)
Raymond Boni - Terronès (2002)

Discography
Ted Curson – Cattin' Curson
Frank Lowe – Tricks of the Trade 
Saheb Sarbib – Live in Europe Vol. 1
David Murray – Let the Music Take You
Willem Breuker – À Paris: Summer Music
Dave Burrell – Black Spring
 John Tchicai & André Goudbeek – Barefoot Dance
Archie Shepp – Live at the Totem Vol : Things Have Got to Change
 Billy Harper – The Awakening
 Raymond Boni & Gérard Marais Concert au Totem
 Sunny Murray Aigu–grave
 Hervé Bourde Engatsse!
 Stu Martin Sunrise
 Roy Burrowes Live at the Dréher: Featuring Mal Waldron
 Michel Edelin Flûtes Rencontre
 Archie Shepp Live at the Totem Vol : 'Round About Midnight
 Toninho Ramos Sons do Brasil
 Philly Joe Jones Filet de Sole / Philly of Soul
 Michel Graillier & Alby Cullaz [UNISSUED]
 Sonny Sharrock Dance With Me, Montana
 Marion Brown & Michel Graillier [UNISSUED]
 Richard Davis Total Package
Abdelhaï Bennani Enfance
 Rob Brown Visage
 Outland Stentor
 Eric Barret & Simon Goubert Linkage
 Open Systems Open Systems
 Sonny Simmons Mixolydis
 Vega Live at Lézards
 Rob Brown The Big Picture
 Claudine François Lonely Woman
 Arnaud Sacase Septentrion
 Guérineau / Duboc / Lasserre [TER]
 James Spaulding & Pierre Christophe Down With It / Live at the Sunside 
 Other Dimensions In Music Live at the Sunset
 Laurent Geniez / Paco el Lobo / Octave Z Hors Pistes / Flamenco Nouveau
 Trio Wha's Nine / Live at the Sunset
 FAB trio (Fonda / Altschul / Bang) A Night in Paris / Live at the Sunset
 Alexandra Grimal Shape / Live at the Sunset
 Sophia Domancich / William Parker / Hamid Drake Washed Away / Live at the Sunside
 Trio Passeurs Existences
 Tribute to Albert Ayler Live at the Dynamo
 Evan Parker / Barry Guy / Paul Lytton Nightwork / Live at the Sunset
 Hal Singer featuring David Murray Challenge
 Rob Brown Unexplained Phenomena
 The Nu Band Relentlessness / Live at the Sunset
 Open Loose Explicit / Live at the Sunset
 Sophia Domancich / Mark Helias / Andrew Cyrille Courtepointe / Live at the Sunside
 Claudine François / Hubert Dupont / Hamid Drake Flying Eagle
 Richard Bonnet / Tony Malaby / Antonin Rayon / Tom Rainey Warrior

Futura Marge (Various Artists)
 Futura Marge, Vol. 1 (2018)
 Futura Marge, Vol. 2 (2019)
 Futura Marge, Vol. 3 (2020)

External links
 (French and English)
 (French and English)

Jazz record labels
Record labels established in 1973
French record labels